Livadeia railway station is a railway station close to Livadeia, Boeotia, Greece. The station opened on 8 March 1904., along with the rest of the line. It is served by intercity trains between Athens and Thessaloniki and by regional trains to Kalampaka.

History
The station opened on 8 March 1904., along with the rest of the line. In 1920 the line became part of the Hellenic State Railways. In 1971, the Hellenic State Railways was reorganised into the OSE taking over responsibilities for most of Greece's rail infrastructure. In 2001 the infrastructure element of OSE was created, known as GAIAOSE; it would henceforth be responsible for the maintenance of stations, bridges and other elements of the network, as well as the leasing and the sale of railway assists. In 2005, TrainOSE was created as a brand within OSE to concentrate on rail services and passenger interface. The station closed in 2016 for renovations and track upgrades. On 20 February 2017, TRAINOSE announced the start of the pilot Athens Suburban Railway route for Athens-Tithorea-Athens. While this service has yet to be implemented, local stopping services now call at Livadeia. The station reopened on 15 December 2017 and was officially inaugurated on 8 January 2018, at the same time as the rest of the Tithorea-Lianokladi section of the line In July 2022, the station began being served by Hellenic Train, the rebranded TranOSE

Facilities
The station has waiting rooms and a staffed booking office within the original brick-built station building. Basic shelters are located on Platform 2, and digital display screens on both platforms. There is a taxi rank in the forecourt, with a postbox at the front entrance. However, there is no onsite parking at the station.

Services
It is served by Regional and Intercity services between Athens, Kalambaka, Leianokladi and Thessaloniki. In February 2018 new services commenced between new Tithorea - Lianokladi high-speed line.
 The station sees around 16 trains per-day.

References

Railway stations in Central Greece
Railway stations opened in 1904
Buildings and structures in Phthiotis